Angus McLeod (born 5 March 1964) is a British sport shooter. He competed for Scotland in the Queen's prize pairs event at the 2014 Commonwealth Games where he won a bronze medal.

References

1964 births
Scottish male sport shooters
Commonwealth Games bronze medallists for Scotland
Living people
Shooters at the 2014 Commonwealth Games
Commonwealth Games silver medallists for Scotland
Shooters at the 2010 Commonwealth Games
Commonwealth Games medallists in shooting
British male sport shooters
Medallists at the 2010 Commonwealth Games
Medallists at the 2014 Commonwealth Games